The fifth and final season of the American television series Haven premiered on September 11, 2014 on Syfy, and concluded on December 17, 2015. The 26-episode season was split into two parts, containing a total of thirteen episodes each. The first part began its broadcast on September 11, 2014 in its new date and time slot on Thursday at 8:00 pm (ET) for the first four episodes, before returning to its previous time slot of Friday at 7:00 pm (ET). The second part began broadcasting with the first two episodes on October 8, 2015 at 10:00 pm (ET). The show stars Emily Rose, Lucas Bryant and Eric Balfour.

Cast

Main 
 Emily Rose as Audrey Parker / Mara / Lucy Ripley / Paige
 Lucas Bryant as Nathan Wuornos
 Eric Balfour as Duke Crocker

Recurring  
 Richard Donat as Vince Teagues
 John Dunsworth as Dave Teagues
 Adam "Edge" Copeland (credited as both Adam Copeland and WWE Superstar Edge) as Dwight Hendrickson
 Colin Ferguson as William
 Jayne Eastwood as Gloria Verrano
 Robert Norman Maillet as Heavy
 Laura Mennell as Charlotte Cross
 Paul Braunstein as Mitchell
 Christian (credited as WWE Superstar Christian) as McHugh
 William Shatner as Croatoan
 Kris Lemche as Seth Byrne
 Rossif Sutherland as Henry / The Sandman
 Tamara Duarte as Hailie Colton

Guest 
 Steve Lund as James Cogan
 Lara Jean Chorostecki as Amy Potter
 Chris Masterson as Morgan Gardener
 Jason Priestley as Chris Brody
 Maurice Dean Wint as Agent Byron Howard
 Nicole de Boer as Marion Caldwell
a  Credited as a special guest star.
b  Also credited as a special guest star in "Morbidity".

Episodes

Production 
On January 28, 2014, Syfy ordered a 26-episode fifth season. This season was split up into two half-seasons due to an increase in the Canadian budget that brought to a total of $28 million instead of the usual $14 million for a single season. The first 13 episodes aired in late 2014 while the remaining 13 aired in late 2015. Production for both parts lasted from April 22, 2014 to December 2014.

Originally set to join lead-in WWE Smackdown on Thursdays after both shows were moved from Friday nights, the first half of season 5 was moved to 8/7c at the last minute due to the delay of Smackdown before returning to Fridays at 7/6c before Smackdown and Z Nation. Unlike the first half, the second half returned to its 10/9c slot where it once again aired after Smackdown on Thursdays.

Laura Mennell was cast as worldly scientist Charlotte Cross (formerly Erin Reid) who uncovers a possible cure to the Troubles. Eric Balfour confirmed Emma Lahana's departure due to family emergency, leading to her character being written off, a fate that was revealed in "Speak No Evil" even though she was originally not going to be killed. Kris Lemche  and Jason Priestley returned to guest star. In addition, Adam "Edge" Copeland's real-life best friend (and former WWE tag team partner) Jay "Christian" Reso guest starred for one episode and is slated to appear in a couple more in the second half. William Shatner appeared in the second half of season 5 in a pivotal role that has the potential to forever impact the fate of the town of Haven and its troubled residents.

It was announced that Lucas Bryant would make his directorial debut in the seventeenth episode of the season, originally titled "Look" before it was changed to "Enter Sandman".

Showrunner and executive producer Gabrielle Stanton explained that the team was already prepared for the end after they filmed both parts of the fifth season in 2014 when Havens cancellation was announced in August 2015, but promised that the final episode would satisfy fans. She also said that they looked at the remaining thirteen episodes as if it is indeed the last because they didn't want to leave it on a giant cliffhanger just in case Haven isn't coming back. However, a year prior to the cancellation, season five being the show's last was first hinted by Eric Balfour when he told TVLine that one of the producers was considering about shooting two different endings at the time production was still filming.

The show's Canadian channel Showcase premiered the mid-season premiere episode "New World Order" at the 2015 Fan Expo Canada on September 7, 2015 a month prior to its public premiere.

Home media release

References

External links 

 
 List of Haven episodes at The Futon Critic
 List of Haven episodes at MSN TV

2014 American television seasons
2015 American television seasons
5
Split television seasons